is a House of Lords judgment which re-affirmed the conviction of five men for their involvement in consensual unusually severe sadomasochistic sexual acts over a 10-year period.  They were convicted of a count of unlawful and malicious wounding and a count of assault occasioning actual bodily harm (contrary to sections 20 and 47 of the Offences against the Person Act 1861). The key issue facing the Court was whether consent was a valid defence to assault in these circumstances, to which the Court answered in the negative. The acts involved included the nailing of a part of the body to a board, but not so as to necessitate, strictly, medical treatment.

The court found no direct precedent for sadomasochism among the senior courts (those of binding precedent) so applied the reasoning of three indirectly analogous binding cases and others.

The case is colloquially known as the Spanner case, named after Operation Spanner, the investigation which led to it.

Facts 
The five appellants engaged in sadomasochistic sexual acts, consenting to the harm which they received; whilst their conviction also covered alike harm against others, they sought as a minimum to have their mutually consented acts to be viewed as lawful. None of the five men complained of any of the acts in which they were involved, which were uncovered by an unrelated police investigation. The physical severity was not disputed. Each appellant (having had legal advice) pleaded guilty to the offence when the trial judge ruled that consent of the victim was no defence.

The question approved and certified as in the public interest on appeal was whether the prosecution had to prove (in all similar cases) a lack of consent on the recipient's part. The appellants argued against conviction under the Offences against the Person Act 1861 as they had in all instances consented to the acts they engaged in (volenti non fit injuria), that as with tattooing and customary-site body piercings their consent would be directly analogous to the lawful exceptions laid out by three cornerstone (and other) widely-spaced precedent cases.

Judgment 

The certified question of appeal which the House of Lords was asked to consider was:

The Lords – by a bare majority, two out of five dissenting – answered this in the negative, holding that consent could not be a defence to these (typically overlapping) offences.

Lord Templeman stated:

His judgment examined the acts to be "unpredictably dangerous and degrading to body and mind and were developed with increasing barbarity and taught to persons whose consents were dubious or worthless".

Lord Jauncey stated:

Lord Lowry stated:

Dissents 
Lord Mustill preferred consensual, private, sexual acts, up to and including involving ABH, to be outside of criminality:
In my opinion it should be a case about the criminal law of private sexual relations, if about anything at all ... [leaving aside] repugnance and moral objection, both of which are entirely natural but neither of which are, in my opinion, grounds upon which the court could properly create a new crime.

Lord Slynn agreed:
 As Goff L.J. put it in Collins v. Wilcock [1984] 1 W.L.R. 1172, 1177: "Generally speaking, consent is a defence to battery." As the word "generally" suggests the exception was itself subject to exceptions. Thus in Stephen's Digest of the Criminal Law it is stated in article 206
"Everyone has a right to consent to the infliction upon himself of bodily harm not amounting to a maim". By way of footnote it is explained that "Injuries
short of maims are not criminal at common law unless they are assaults, but an assault is inconsistent with consent". Maim could not be the subject matter
of consent since it rendered a man less able to fight or defend himself. (Hawkins Pleas of the Crown, 8th ed., Book 1, p. 107). Nor could a person
consent to the infliction of death [the next article of the digest] or to an infliction of bodily harm in such manner as to amount to a breach of the
peace (article 208).

The law has recognised cases...where consent can be a defence...surgical operations, sports, the chastisement of children, jostling in a crowd, but all subject to a reasonable degree of force being used, tattooing and earpiercing; the latter [not a defence] include death and maiming. None of these situations, in most cases pragmatically accepted, either covers or is analogous to the facts of the present case. It is, however, suggested that the answer to the question certified flows from the decisions in three cases...R. v. Coney (1882)...the injuries given and received in prize-
fights are injurious to the public...Rex. v. Donovan [1934]...was accepted to be an issue for the jury as to whether the prosecution had proved that the girl had not consented and whether the consent was immaterial...Attorney General's Reference (No. 6 of 1980) [1981] two youths fought...argument...consent is no defence "where people...try to cause...or cause each other bodily harm for no good reason."

It seems to me that the notion of "consent" fits ill into the situation where there is a fight.

Three propositions seem to me to be clear.

It is ". . . inherent in the conception of assault and battery that the victim does not consent" (Glanville Williams [1962] Grim. L.R. 74, 75).

Secondly, consent must be full and free and must be as to the actual level of force used or pain inflicted. Thirdly, there exist areas where the law disregards the victim's consent even where that consent is freely and fully given. These areas may relate to the person (e.g. a child); they may relate to the place (e.g. in public); they may relate to the nature of the harm done. It is the latter which is in issue in the present case.

...

If a line has to be drawn, as I think it must, to be workable, it cannot be allowed to fluctuate within particular charges and in the interests of legal
certainty it has to be accepted that consent can be given to acts which are said to constitute [ABH] and wounding.

...

My conclusion is thus that as the law stands, adults can consent to acts done in private which do not result in serious bodily harm...[Here]...it must be proved by the prosecution that the person to whom the act was done did not consent to it. Accordingly I consider that these appeals should be allowed and the conviction set aside.

Criticism 
Legal journals and textbooks of the 21st century tend towards criticism of the majority's analysis and overtones. Baker writes: "The sadomasochists might argue that the telos of the participants' activities in sadomasochism is merely to achieve sexual gratification. But every time they want to achieve the ulterior aim of sexual gratification, they need to harm each other. The harm has to be repeated each time the recipient wants to receive sadomasochistic pleasure. The two are inseparable—the sexual gratification can only be achieved while the harm is being inflicted. Per contra, adornment procedures only involve a one-off wounding, burning, etc., which results in a long-term benefit. There is nothing unreasonable about preventing people from repeatedly inflicting grievous bodily harm upon others, merely because they want to repeat the ephemeral sexual thrill it gives them. Nonetheless, it seems that this argument should not apply to [ABH]. Those who regularly inflict [ABH] on themselves by smoking and drinking excessively are not criminalized, nor are those who supply them with the instruments of harm. Similarly, professional athletes regularly subject their bodies to [ABH], but recover." Marianne Giles calls the judgment "paternalism of an unelected, unrepresentative group who use but fail to acknowledge that power".

Two years later Baker argued "that an application of the harm principle to many forms of nontherapeutic cosmetic surgery shows that these procedures are a form of physical harm, not a form of medicine, and therefore ought to be criminalized. Not only does the harm principle support the case for criminalization, but so too do the relevant precedents. This article focuses on the general moral justifications (wrongful harm to others) for criminalizing unnecessary harmful cosmetic surgery, but legal doctrine is also invoked to demonstrate that there is a legal justification for criminalization. The famous English case of R. v. Brown will be discussed to outline the core legal case for criminalization. This article does not aim to provide a comparative study of the U.S. and English authorities, but rather aims to make theoretical arguments for criminalization, and thus, works from the legal premise that in most states the U.S. courts have taken a similar position to that taken in the seminal English House of Lords decision in R. v. Brown."

Social impact 
Opposition to the judgment (in both consecutive appeals) legally focusses on the dissenting two final judges and the contrasting R v Wilson whereby a husband painfully branded his initials on his wife's buttocks at her request. Fears of bias due to heteronormativity were allayed in R v Emmett, whereby the lower court of binding precedent, the Court of Appeal of England and Wales, held the same rules apply to heterosexual participants in such acts.

Citing R v Brown, law professors Fox and Thomson (2005) argue against non-therapeutic circumcision of boys, to the audience of medical professionals.

Similar cases 
 K.A. v Belgium
 Laskey, Jaggard and Brown v UK

See also 
 Operation Spanner
 Consent (criminal law)
Rough sex murder defense

Footnotes

References

External links 
 The Circumcision Ref. Library, R v Brown full case judgment
 https://app.justis.com/case/r-v-brown-r-v-lucas-r-v-jaggard-r-v-laskey-r-v-carter-conjoined/overview/aXadm5Cdn1mdl

House of Lords cases
BDSM
1993 in British law
1993 in LGBT history
United Kingdom LGBT rights case law
1993 in case law